Hunyadiscus is a genus of air-breathing land snails, terrestrial pulmonate gastropod mollusks in the family Plectopylidae.

Species
Species in the genus Hunyadiscus include:
 Hunyadiscus andersoni (W. T. Blanford, 1869)
 Hunyadiscus saurini Páll-Gergely, 2016
 Hunyadiscus tigrina Páll-Gergely, 2018

References

External links
 Páll-Gergely B., Muratov I.V. & Asami T. (2016). The family Plectopylidae (Gastropoda, Pulmonata) in Laos with the description of two new genera and a new species. ZooKeys. 592: 1-26

Plectopylidae
Taxa named by William Henry Benson